Sevran – Livry is an RER station in Sevran and near Livry-Gargan, a northerly suburb of Paris, in Seine-Saint-Denis department, France. The station is in Zone 4 of the Carte orange. It is situated on the RER B suburban railway line. It will also be a station for Paris Metro Line 16 in the future.

External links

 

Railway stations in Seine-Saint-Denis
Réseau Express Régional stations
Paris Métro line 16